The cleft chin murder was a killing which occurred as part of a string of crimes during 1944, and was mentioned in George Orwell's essay "Decline of the English Murder". It became known as the "cleft chin murder" because the murder victim, George Edward Heath, a taxi driver, had a cleft chin.

The culprits were Karl Hultén, a Swedish-born deserter from the U.S. Army, and Elizabeth Jones, an eighteen-year-old waitress.

Jones later said she dreamed of "doing something exciting," and fantasized about being a stripper.  At the time, Hultén described himself as an officer and as a Chicago gangster, both of which were false.

History
Jones was born in Neath, Wales, in 1926. At the age of thirteen she ran away from home and eventually she was sent to an approved school because she was considered to be "beyond parental control."

Hultén was born in Sweden in 1922 and had enlisted in the U.S. Army after the Attack on Pearl Harbor.

On 3 October 1944, Jones (married but separated from her husband) met Hultén in a tea shop; he claimed to be an officer and a gangster (In fact he had been a grocery clerk and a mechanic; married and had a child; and was AWOL). The relationship lasted only six days. During that time they knocked over a nurse cycling along a country lane and robbed her; picked up a hitchhiker, knocked her unconscious, robbed her, and then threw her into a river to drown (though she survived); finally, they murdered a medically disharged ex-english soldier/taxi driver George Edward Heath near Staines in Middlesex. They robbed Heath of £8, which they spent at the dog races the next day.

Initially Hultén had stolen an army truck, which he eventually abandoned, but he kept the murdered taxi driver's car. After spending the taxi driver's £8, Jones announced she wanted a fur coat. Hultén attacked a woman in the street and tried to snatch her coat, but the police came and Hultén only just managed to escape in the stolen car.

He was eventually caught because the car was still in his possession; to the American CID he tried to pass himself off with his alias as Lt Ricky Allen 501st Parachute Infantry Regiment; his real identity was established. The Americans waived the Visiting Forces Act allowing him to be tried in  a British court.  In the meantime Jones had gone to the police and admitted to the crimes, to ease her conscience. During the trial they implicated each other. They were both found guilty of murdering Heath and were sentenced by Mr Justice Charles to be hanged. While Hultén was executed at Pentonville Prison on 8 March 1945, Jones was reprieved and released in May 1954. Her subsequent fate is unknown, although series 1 episode 6 of the television series Murder Maps reports her death as occurring in 1980.

The reprieve caused some controversy, because many people considered the crimes to be cowardly, and in a war-torn Britain where everyone was pulling together to face a common enemy, almost treasonous. "SHE SHOULD HANG" was graffitied in several places in Jones's home town. A number of references to the murder appear in the contemporary diary of Arthur Basil Cottle (1917-1994), the Bletchley Park cryptanalyst. They range from the outrage of his landlady, "Mrs Read, quite desolee, about the Jones reprieve", to the aside by a Foreign Office civilian at Bletchley, Audrey Clare Stobart, "Clare is getting very witty - her remark about men wanting to marry Jones because it'll be safer than taking up taxi-driving."

Cultural references
The crime spree was documented in an episode, "The Jack Handle", of the 1950s radio crime anthology The Black Museum, starring Orson Welles.

A film, Chicago Joe and the Showgirl was made in 1990, based on the story, directed by Bernard Rose, written by David Yallop, and starring Emily Lloyd as Elizabeth Jones, Kiefer Sutherland as Karl, and Patsy Kensit.

References

Decline of the English Murder, George Orwell
https://web.archive.org/web/20170807113613/http://www.stephen-stratford.com/chelft_chin_case.htm

External links

Murder in England
1944 murders in the United Kingdom
1944 in England
American people executed abroad